The NME Album of the Year and Single Of The Year were announced on 11 December 2008. It was the 37th countdown of the most popular albums and tracks of the year, as chosen by music reviewers and independent journalists who work for the magazine and for NME.com.

Albums

Bold: Album contains Song of the Year

Countries represented
 = 26
 = 19
 = 2
 = 1
 = 1
 = 1
 = 1
 = 1

Singles

Artists with multiple entries

3 Entries
MGMT (1, 4, 5)
Vampire Weekend (10, 33, 39)
Glasvegas (2, 43, 49)

2 Entries
Mystery Jets (3, 25)
The Last Shadow Puppets (22, 27)
Elbow (13, 28)
Florence and the Machine (14, 30)
Ladyhawke (15, 35)
Late of the Pier (34, 42)
Laura Marling (25, 31)
Crystal Castles (44, 45)

Countries represented
 = 27
 = 14
 = 3
 = 2
 = 2
 = 1
 = 1
 = 1

References

New Musical Express
2008 in British music
British music-related lists